Kiril Nikolovski (born 9 June 1988) is a Macedonian professional basketball player born in Skopje.
He is a former member of the Macedonian national basketball team.

Pro career 
Nikolovski started his pro career with Macedonian Team MZT Skopje in 2007.

Kiril is considered to be a versatile big man because of his dominating stature of 2.10 m (6 ft 11 in). His comfortable position is at center, however, he is capable of playing as a power forward due to his upside and talent.

On 28 June 2017, he signed with Karpoš Sokoli.

On 21 November 2017, he signed with Rabotnički.

Macedonian national team 
Nikolovski has also been a member of the Macedonian national basketball team since 2004, when he represented Macedonia at the FIBA Europe Under-16 Championship. He has competed with the team at all FIBA levels of U16, U18, U20, even the Senior team. He had helped Macedonia qualify to the EuroBasket 2011.
Kiril Nikolovski is candidate for the Macedonian national basketball team for the 2012 FIBA World Olympic Qualifying Tournament in Caracas, Venezuela. According to the Coach Marjan Lazovski, Nikolovski, along with Aleksandar Kostoski and Bojan Trajkovski are likely to be the newest additions to the Senior team.
“There is no need for big transformations of the roster (2011), but I will for certainly include Kiril Nikolovski (center) in the final squad (2012),” he said.

References

External links
http://www.eurobasket2011.com/lt/cid_Y15gdIRhHQ-bXlZtZIg-a3.teamID_2604.compID_qMRZdYCZI6EoANOrUf9le2.season_2011.roundID_7524.playerID_49362.html
http://au.eurosport.com/basketball/kiril-nikolovski_prs288184/person.shtml
https://archive.today/20130117212408/http://bgbasket.com/en/player_career.php?id=7286

1988 births
Living people
Centers (basketball)
KK MZT Skopje players
KK Rabotnički players
Macedonian men's basketball players
Sportspeople from Skopje